The following is a timeline of the history of the municipality of Mayagüez, Puerto Rico.

18th-19th centuries

 1760 - Nuestra Señora de la Candelaria de Mayagüez (Our Lady of Candlemas) settlement established by Spanish colonist Faustino Martínez de Matos.
 1763 - Settlement of Mayaguez formally separated from the larger San Germán area.
 1770 - Population: 1,800.
 1823 - José María Ramírez de Arellano becomes mayor.
 1836
 Mayaguez becomes a villa (chartered town).
 Public warehouse and dock constructed.
 1841
 Fire.
 "Entry port privilege" relocated to Mayaguez from Cabo Rojo (approximate date).
 1845 - Mayagüez City Hall built.
 1848 - El Imparcial and El Propagador newspapers begins publication.
 1849 - Jail built.
 1850 - El Semanario Mayaguezano begins publication.
 1852 - Fire.
 1860
 Market building constructed.
 San Antonio Hospital active (approximate date).
 1863 - Avisador del Comercio newspaper begins publication.
 1870 - Cemetery established.
 1873 - Mayagüez attains city status.
 1874 - Biblioteca Popular de Mayagüez (public library) and Circulo de Amigos founded.
 1883 - Population: 26,705 in ayuntamiento (city); 123,583 in departamento (province).
 1893 - Sociedad Anónima Tranvía de Mayagüez (transit entity) active (approximate date).
 1894
 Escuela Libre de Música (music school) founded.
 City coat of arms granted.
 1896 - Statue of Christopher Columbus erected in the Plaza Colón.
 1898 - Theodore Schwan, a brigadier general of the U.S. enters Mayagüez with the American Cavalry after winning the Battle of Silva Heights.
 1899
 Hormigueros becomes part of Mayagüez.
 Population: 15,187.

20th century

 1901
 U.S. Tropical Agriculture Research Station founded.
 Voz de la Patria newspaper begins publication.
 1909 - Teatro Yagüez built.
 1910
 Diario del Oeste newspaper begins publication.
  Population: 16,591.
 1911 - College of Agriculture and Mechanic Arts opens. The US Department of Agriculture sends a field agent to the area of Mayagüez and Hormigueros to document everything he sees.
 1912 - Masonic Logia Adelphia built.
 1913
 Mayagüez Tramway Company formed.
 Centro Español built.
 1918 - October 11: 1918 San Fermín earthquake.
 1919 - June 19: Teatro Yagüez burns down.
 1920 - Population: 19,069.
 1926 - Tram service ends.
 1930 - Population: 37,060.
 1937
 WPRA radio begins broadcasting.
 Compañía Cervecera de Puerto Rico in business.
 1938 - Indios de Mayagüez baseball team formed.
 1940 - Population: 50,376.
 1946 - WKJB radio begins broadcasting.
 1955 - WORA-TV (television) begins broadcasting.
 1966 - University of Puerto Rico at Mayagüez active.
 1969 - Benjamin Cole becomes mayor.
 1970 - Population: 68,872.
 1976 - Roman Catholic Diocese of Mayagüez established.
 1983 - First newspaper originating in Mayagüez begins publication.
 1993 - José Guillermo Rodríguez becomes mayor.
 2000 - Population: 78,647.

21st century

 2010
 Isidoro García Stadium and Mayagüez Athletics Stadium open.
 Parque del Litoral (park) built.
 2010 Central American and Caribbean Games sport event held in Mayagüez.
 Population: 89,080.

See also

 History of Mayagüez
 List of mayors of Mayagüez, Puerto Rico
 National Register of Historic Places listings in Mayagüez
 Timeline of Bayamón, Puerto Rico, Ponce, San Juan

References

Bibliography

in English
  (Also description of town)
 
 
 
 
 
 
 
 
  (About Bejamín Cole era)

in Spanish
  (reprint 1998)

External links

  (Includes bibliographic information on Mayagüez history)
 Items related to Mayagüez, Puerto Rico, various dates (via University of Puerto Rico's Biblioteca Digital Puertorriqueña)
 Items related to Mayagüez, Puerto Rico, various dates (via Digital Public Library of America)
 Digitized materials related to Mayagüez in the Archivo Histórico Nacional of Spain, records of the Ministerio de Ultramar; via Portal de Archivos Españoles

History of Puerto Rico
Mayagüez, Puerto Rico
Mayaguez
Years in Puerto Rico